Juan Santiago (born February 14, 1985 in Denver, Colorado) is an American professional boxer in the Welterweight division.

Pro career
Santiago's biggest career victory was over an undefeated Ty Barnett (16-0), he would knockout Barnett in the first round.

On October 1, 2010 Santiago lost by knockout to the undefeated Archie Ray Márquez in just three rounds, the bout was on Showtime.

Santiago has lost to six undefeated fighters Sonny Fredrickson, Felix Verdejo, Eloy Perez, Diego Magdaleno, Archie Ray Márquez, and Vernon Paris.  The Perez fight was for the North American Boxing Organization super featherweight title.

References

External links

Lightweight boxers
1985 births
Living people
American male boxers